Solid is the debut album by the American bass guitarist  Michael Henderson, released in 1976 on Buddah Records.

Track listing
All tracks composed by Michael Henderson
"Make Me Feel Better"   	 3:00   	
"Time" 	3:11 	
"Let Love Enter" 	2:54 	
"Treat Me Like a Man" 	4:02 	
"Solid" 	6:34 	
"Be My Girl" 	5:07 	
"You Haven't Made It to the Top" 	4:04 	
"Valentine Love" 	3:57 	
"Stay with Me This Summer" 	3:42

Personnel
Michael Henderson - lead and backing vocals, bass guitar, guitar, drums on "Solid"
Bruce Nazarian - guitar, synthesizer
Jerry Jones, Leslie Daniels - drums
Lester Williams, Nimrod Lumpkin, Rudy Robinson - keyboards
Ralph Armstrong - guitar
Mark Johnson - synthesizer
Muruga Sharma aka Muruga Booker - percussion
Eli Fontaine, Marcus Belgrave, Norma Jean Bell - horns
Rudy Robinson, Travis Biggs - strings
Brandye, Rose Henderson Williams - backing vocals

Charts

Singles

References

External links
 Michael Henderson-Solid at Discogs

1976 debut albums
Michael Henderson albums
Buddah Records albums